Underwood is a suburb in the City of Logan, Queensland, Australia.

History
Underwood is situated in the Yugarabul traditional Indigenous Australian country of the Brisbane and surrounding regions. Towards the south-east of Underwood towards Beenleigh is the Bundjalung traditional Aboriginal country.

The origin of the suburb name is from William Underwood, who was an early property owner in the area. William Underwood had established the Commercial Hotel, which operated from the early 1870s through to 1895 on land nearby Beenleigh Road. The suburb Underwood was gazetted in 1975 and was part of both Brisbane City Council and the former Shire of Albert before the creation of Logan City in the year 1978.

Demographics

Of these, 50.5% were female and 49.5% were male. The median age of the Underwood population was 33 years, 5 years below the national median of 38.  51.2% of people living in Underwood were born in Australia. The other top responses for country of birth were China 4.7%, India 4.5%, New Zealand 4.3%, Korea, Republic of (South) 3%, Taiwan 2.4%.  54.3% of people spoke only English at home; the next most common languages were 8.1% Mandarin, 3.7% Korean, 3.7% Cantonese, 3.5% Punjabi, 2.3% Arabic.

Education 
There are no schools in Underwood. The nearest primary schools are Eight Mile Plains State School in neighbouring Eight Mile Plains to the north-west, Springwood Road State School in neighbouring Rochedale South to the north-east, and Kuraby State School in neighbouring Kuraby to the west. The nearest secondary schools are Rochedale State High School in neighbouring Rochedale to the north, Springwood State High School in neighbouring Springwood to the east, and Runcorn State High School in Runcorn to the west.

Amenities 
Operated by Logan City Council Libraries, the Logan North branch Library opened in 2008 and is located on the corner of Sports Drive and Springwood Road, Underwood.  Public WiFi is available.

Transport
Underwood is accessible by road from the Pacific Motorway (M1). Public transport is available via the Springwood Bus Station along the South East Busway. The nearest train stations are the Kuraby Railway Station in the adjacent suburb of Kuraby, and Trinder Park Railway Station in the adjacent suburb of Woodridge.

References

External links

 

Suburbs of Logan City